The 4L60E (and similar 4L65E) is a series of automatic transmissions from General Motors. Designed for longitudinal engine configurations, the series includes 4 forward gears and 1 reverse gear. The 4L60E is the electronically commanded evolution of the Turbo-Hydramatic 700R4, originally produced in 1982.

The 4L60E and 4L65E are built at Toledo Transmission in Toledo, Ohio and have also been built at Romulus Transmission in Romulus, Michigan and Ramos Arizpe, Mexico.

The two transmissions cannot be differentiated from the outside. The 4L65E shares the same exterior parts but have stronger internals such as 5 pinion planets compared to 4 in the 4L60E. 4L60E uses a 6.5" depth bell with 6 bolts for non gen 3 LS applications and a 7" depth bell with 7 bolts for LS applications. The 4L65E/70E uses a 7" depth bell and 7 bolts. 

They also have different input shafts and torque converters. 4L60E's uses a 298mm input shaft for non LS and a 300mm input shaft for LS applications. 4L65E/4L70E uses a 300mm input shaft and converter designed for LS applications only. 

Gear ratios:

4L60-E
The TH700R4 was renamed "4L60" (RPO MD8) following the new General Motors naming convention when the electronic version, 4L60E (RPO M30), was phased in as the 4L60 was being phased out. This happened in 1993 for trucks, vans, and SUVs, and 1994 for rear wheel drive passenger cars. In 1996, a bolt-on bell housing was phased in (along with a six-bolt tailhousing) for S-10 Trucks and S-10 Blazers and beginning in 1998 for all other applications. Beginning in 1998 a new 300mm torque converter with improved higher-capacity internals, 300mm style input shaft, and 300mm style pump was also introduced on models coupled to a Gen III Small Block. It weighs 133 pounds without transmission fluid.

The 4L60E family of transmissions use 2 shift solenoids, initially called Shift Solenoid A & Shift Solenoid B, later changed to comply with OBD II (On Board Diagnostics revision 2) regulations to 1-2 Shift Solenoid & 2-3 Shift solenoid. By activating and deactivating the solenoids in a predetermined pattern by the PCM, 4 distinct gear ratios can be achieved. The last 4L60Es were only used in the GM Vans in 2013, before being replaced by the 6L80E. The shift solenoid pattern, also sometimes referred to as solenoid firing order, is as follows;

Shift Solenoid Pattern

Applications

Buick Rainier, 2004–2007
Buick Roadmaster, 1994–1996
Cadillac Escalade, 1999–2006
Cadillac Fleetwood, 1994–1996
Chevrolet Astro, 1993–2005
Chevrolet Avalanche, 2002–2008
Chevrolet S-10 Blazer, 1994–2005
Chevrolet Camaro, 1994–2002
Chevrolet Caprice, 1994–1996
Chevrolet C/K 1500/2500 (2500 with six-bolt axle pattern), 1993–1999
Chevrolet Colorado, 2004–2012
Chevrolet Corvette, 1994–2004
Chevrolet Express, 1996–2014
Chevrolet Impala SS, 1994–1996
Chevrolet S-10, 1994–2004
Chevrolet Silverado 1500, 1999–2013
Chevrolet SSR, 2003–2006
Chevrolet Suburban 1500, 1993–2008
Chevrolet Tahoe, 1995–2010
Chevrolet TrailBlazer, 2002–2009
Chevrolet Van, 1993–1996
GMC Canyon, 2004–2012
GMC Envoy, 2003–2009
GMC Jimmy, 1993–2005 
GMC Safari, 1993–2005
GMC Savana, 2003–2014
GMC Sierra 1500/2500 (2500 with six-bolt axle pattern), 1993–2013
GMC Sonoma, 1994–2004
GMC Suburban 1500, 1993–1999
GMC Yukon, 1992–2009
GMC Yukon XL 1500, 2000–2008
GMC Vandura, 1993–1996
Holden Commodore (VR, VS, VT, VX, VY, VZ, VE), 1993–2012
Holden Monaro, 2001–2006
Holden Caprice (VR, VS, WH, WK, WL and WM), 1994–2008
Hummer H3
Oldsmobile Bravada
Pontiac Firebird, 1994–2002
Pontiac GTO, 2004 only
Saab 9-7X, 2005–2009
Isuzu Ascender, 2003–2008

4L65E
An updated 4L60E, the 4L65E (RPO M32), was phased in the 2001 model year when coupled behind the 6.0 Vortec.

Applications:
Cadillac Escalade
Cadillac Escalade EXT
Chevrolet Corvette, 2005 only
Chevrolet Silverado SS
GMC Sierra Denali
GMC Yukon Denali
Holden Commodore, VZ 6.0 only
Holden Crewman, 2004 only
Holden One Tonner, 2004 only
HSV Clubsport VZ 
Hummer H2
Pontiac GTO, 2005–2006 (M32, 3.46:1 final drive)

See also
 List of GM transmissions

References

4L60